L. alba  may refer to:
 Limnanthes alba, the white meadowfoam, a flowering plant species native to California and Oregon
 Lippia alba, a flowering plant species native to southern Texas in the United States, Mexico, the Caribbean, Central America and South America

See also
 Alba (disambiguation)